The ICARUS Initiative, short for International Cooperation for Animal Research Using Space, is an international effort to track the migratory patterns of small flying animals using radio transmitters. The project began in 2002 and the tracking system was installed on the International Space Station (ISS) in August 2018, switched on in July 2019, and began operations in September 2020. The director for the ICARUS project is Martin Wikelski, director of the Max Planck Institute of Animal Behavior in Radolfzell, Germany.

Technology
Since the late 1980s animal tracking via satellite has been accomplished through the use of the Argos system, which was historically limited to larger animals and with which ICARUS hopes to compete.  One major hurdle to tracking the movements of birds and especially insects is creating a transmitter small enough to place on individual animals. The ICARUS project currently implements 5 g radio transmitters that include a GPS receiver, but has plans to use devices weighing less than 1 g in the future. Wikelski believes that within about five years there will be transmitters light enough to attach to a roughly 120 mg honeybee. Since the ISS is only 320 km from the Earth's surface instead of 850 km like the Argos satellites, the ICARUS trackers do not have to create as strong of a radio signal and can therefore be smaller.  The transmitters tags are solar-powered and only activate when a satellite passes over them. About 5,000 to 10,000 tags were expected to be in use at the time of the 2015 launch.

After some delays, the installation of the necessary hardware on the International Space Station was completed in 2018. However, a defect in the ICARUS computer system meant it had to be returned to Earth, fixed, and transported back to the station in 2019. Testing for the monitoring system began in March 2020 and scientific operations officially started in September. Data transmissions from the ISS were terminated on March 3, 2022.

Applications
The primary purpose of the ICARUS Initiative is to greatly expand available data on animal migrations for the sake of conservation, although a variety of other fields of study may be advanced by the project's information gathering. Studying the movements of birds and insects may further scientists' understanding of how natural hazards and human interactions affect animal populations. Another application for the data collected by ICARUS is to investigate a possible link between unusual animal movements and impending earthquakes. It has long been hypothesized that some birds and bats can predict earthquakes because of their ability to detect shifts in magnetic fields, but so far the only evidence to support this has been anecdotal. The project's migratory data may also provide greater insight into the propagation of animal-borne diseases like SARS, bird flu and West Nile virus.

Supporters
DLR Institute for Planetary Research
European Space Agency
Food and Agriculture Organization
UNEP/CMS (United Nations Environment Programme - Convention on migratory species)

References

External links

White Paper

Bird migration
Ornithological equipment and methods
Wireless locating